The Somerton Power Station is an open cycle, gas turbine power station located in the Melbourne suburb of Somerton, Victoria, Australia.  It is owned and operated by AGL Energy. The facility normally operates three or four hours at a time as a peaking power plant, but is able to run 24 hours a day, seven days a week if required.

The plant cost $125 million to build, with the 2003 opening being delayed by environmental concerns and technical issues. The plant uses four second-hand 37.5MW GT-1 Frame 6B gas turbines, manufactured under license to GE by Alstom and Thomassen International.

See also
List of power stations in Victoria

References

External links
 AGL Somerton website

Natural gas-fired power stations in Victoria (Australia)
Buildings and structures in the City of Hume
Energy infrastructure completed in 2003
2003 establishments in Australia